Diadegma crassicorne is a wasp first described by Johann Ludwig Christian Gravenhorst in 1829.
No subspecies are listed.

References

crassicorne
Taxa named by Johann Ludwig Christian Gravenhorst
Insects described in 1829